Princess Nourah Bint Abdulrahman University (PNU)
is a public women's university located in Riyadh, the capital of Saudi Arabia. It is the largest women's university in the world.

The university offers diplomas, bachelor and postgraduate degrees. It has 34 colleges in the city of Riyadh and in the neighbouring cities, an Arabic Language Institute (for non-speakers of Arabic), a Deanship of Community Service and Continuous Education, and a Community College. It has more than 5,000 academic and administrative staff.

History and name
The university was founded in 1970 as the first College of Education for women in the Kingdom. Within the following 25 years, there were 102 similar colleges in 72 cities around the country, accommodating 60,000 students. There were 6 colleges in the city of Riyadh alone, primarily in the fields of education, social service, science, arts, and home economics. In 2004, the decision was made to unify all of the women's colleges in Riyadh, thus creating the first all-female university in the Kingdom. Other colleges around the Kingdom were unified and expanded in their respected regions into independent universities.

In 2008, the Custodian of the Two Holy Mosques, King Abdullah bin Abdulaziz Al Saud inaugurated the campus and changed the university's name to "Princess Nourah Bint Abdulrahman University" after Princess Nourah bint Abdulrahman, the sister of the country's first king and leader, King Abdulaziz. Nourah in Arabic means "light." With this launch was the building of the world's largest and most modern women's institution of higher education in a self-contained higher education city. The first rector was Princess Al Jawhara bint Fahd Al Saud.

On 12 June 2011, the new campus was opened in an official ceremony by the Custodian of the Two Holy Mosques, King Abdullah bin Abdulaziz Al Saud, during which he said:
"Women carry a responsibility that is more than a duty, to maintain the stability of society and contribute to building the economy of the nation, and to represent the community and the nation to the highest standards, outside and inside the country. To be the caring mother, exemplary citizen and productive employee. Outside the nation, to be the ambassador of her country and community, and to represent well her religion, faith and our values."

In February 2017, the university was the host of the first-ever opera in Saudi Arabia. The show, "Antar and Alba", was produced by Opera Lebanon.

Colleges and Departments 

Health Colleges

 College of Medicine
 Basic Sciences
 College of Dentistry
 Preventive Dental Sciences
 Clinical Dental Sciences
 Basic Dental Sciences
 College of Nursing
 College of Pharmacy
 Pharmaceutical Sciences
 Clinical Pharmacy
 College of Health and Rehabilitation Sciences
 Rehabilitation Sciences
 Health Sciences
 Medical Technology
 Communication Sciences

Science Colleges

 College of Business and Administration
 Economics
 Law
 Business Administration
 Accounting
 College of Computer and Information Science
 Computer Sciences
 Information Systems
 Networking and Telecommunication Systems
 College of Science
 Physics
 Chemistry
 Mathematical Sciences
 Biology

Humanities Colleges

 College of Art and Design
 Interior Design
 Graphic Design and Digital Media
 Painting and Printmaking
 Fashion Design and Textiles
 College of Art
 Arabic Language and Literature
 English Language and Literature
 Geography
 History and Civilization
 Library and Information
 Islamic Studies
 College of Education
 Curriculum and Instruction
 Early Childhood
 Special Needs Education
 Psychology
 College of Home Economics
 Nutrition & Food Science
 College of Social Work
 College of Languages and Translation
 English Language and Translation
 French Language and Translation
 Community College
 Computer Sciences and Information Technology
 Administrative Sciences

The Deanship of Community Service and Continuous Education offers various diploma options.
The Arabic Language Institute (for non-speakers of Arabic) offers grant scholarships to non-speakers of Arabic from different countries. The institute has over 350 students from more than 40 countries.

In early 2018, the university became the first in the Kingdom to offer a driving school for women, following the allowance of King Salman to grant women the right to drive in the Kingdom. More than 50,000 female students are expected to take part. Despite these advancements Saudi Arabia still has some of the worst rates of unemployment among women in the world

Preparatory Year Program (PYP):

To ensure quality and a smooth transition into university life, PNU students are required to enroll in a two-year preparatory program of necessary skills, such as:

 Study skills
 Intensive English program
 Communication skills
 Computer skills

Campus services and facilities

Description 

The campus was constructed in a record time of two years, supported by 75,000 construction workers and the latest building machinery and methodologies. It is 13 million square meters in size, with a maximum capacity of 60,000 students.
The campus has 600 high-tech smart buildings, large-capacity student residencies, various models of faculty residence units, and three spacious, state-of-the-art recreation centers. In addition, it has pre-schools, primary schools, intermediate and secondary schools. It also has an elegant central library, research centers, a university hospital, student support centers, student-accessible sport facilities, a convention center and an automated metro system by Hitachi Rail Italy.

Health and Wellness 

Sports Facilities include a number of sports halls (basketball, volleyball, aerobatics, bicycles, etc.) as well as an olympic sized swimming pool. In 2016, the university signed a Memorandum of Understanding with the General Authority for Sports, aiming to increase participation in sports to 40% by 2030.

Sustainable Design 
 Water recycling plant
 Solar thermal plant
 4000 sq. meters of Solar Panels, which provide 16% of heating and 18% of air-conditioning needs

38 of the university's buildings, totaling a million square meters, have been submitted for a Leadership in Energy and Environmental Design (LEED) green building rating and the library has applied for the second highest LEED "Gold" rating.

Central Library

The library holds over 2 million books in both Arabic and English with a maximum capacity of 5 million, in addition to numerous journal subscriptions, government publications, dissertations, databases, and manuscripts.

Research Centers
Social Research and Women's Studies

 Social Science Research.
 Women's Studies Research
 Human and Social Development Research
 Natural Sciences Research Center

Aljazeera Chair

Academic Societies Established

 Saudi Society for Child Care.
 Arabic Language Society.

Student Support Centers
 Clubs and Student Councils
 Meeting Rooms and Offices
 Media and screening rooms
 Restaurants and Cafes
 Banquet Halls
 Bookstore
 Pharmacy
 Supermarket
 Bank

Convention center
 2 large halls
 2,700 seats (largest in the country)
 1,350 seats
 13 conference and meeting rooms.

Transportation
Due to the physical size of the campus, an efficient means of transporting students needed to be developed. To this end, an 11.5 km automated guideway transit system, the Princess Nora bint Abdul Rahman University Automated People Mover (PNU-APM), was constructed. The network, built to light metro standards, opened in 2012 and has 4 lines and 14 stations. It has 22 two car AnsaldoBreda Driverless Metro trains, each having a maximum capacity of up to 110 passengers and a maximum speed of 60 km/h. The driverless technology used in the trains is the same as that of the Copenhagen Metro.

International partnerships
 University of Auckland in New Zealand
 University of Southern Denmark in Scandinavia
 Valencia College in the United States
 Rouen University in France
 Erasmus University Rotterdam in the Netherlands
 Monash University in Australia
 Dublin City University in Ireland

Memberships in Regional and International Associations
 International Association of Universities
 Federation of the Universities of the Islamic World
 Association of Arab Universities
 The Society of Arab Universities
 The Scientific Society of Arab Nursing Faculties
 Colleges of Computing and Information Society
 Association of Social Services
 American Council on Education
 Association of Colleges of Fine Arts
 Scientific Society for Arab Faculties f Medicine
 Society of Colleges of Science

See also 

 Education in Saudi Arabia
 List of universities and colleges in Saudi Arabia
 Women's rights in Saudi Arabia

References

External links 
 Official site in Arabic and in English
 Aerial view and building photos
 Photographs from Tridonic.fr
 Dedication of the new campus by King Abdullah (video)

1970 establishments in Saudi Arabia
Educational institutions established in 1970
Education in Riyadh
Universities and colleges in Saudi Arabia
Women's universities and colleges in Saudi Arabia